Ateleia gummifera is a species of flowering plant in the family Fabaceae. It is found only in Cuba.

References

Swartzieae
Flora of Cuba
Endangered plants
Taxonomy articles created by Polbot